Holihan Brothers of Lawrence, Mass. began as a producer of whiskeys in 1856.  They operated the Diamond Spring Brewery from 1912 until around Prohibition and then opened after Prohibition in 1933.  They produced beer and ales under the Holihan's and Diamond Spring labels. The company also made soda beginning in 1917.

History

Roots as a whiskey distiller
The company was established in 1856 in Lawrence, Mass. by Patrick Holihan, a twenty-five year old Irish immigrant, and his brother Peter, as a grocer and liquor distiller, P&P Holihan a.k.a. Holihan Brothers.  The liquor distiller was sold in about 1880 upon Patrick Holihan's death and ceased production, only to be bought by his three sons and reopened as a whiskey distiller.

Their firm carried a general line of liquors, including two brands they claimed as proprietary, “Banquet Pure Rye” and “Old 56,”  the latter presumably for the year their father and his brother had founded the business.

Their facility was at 427 Common Street near the corner of Hampshire Street. That building was apparently torn down in 1973.

Establishment of the brewery 

In 1912, the three Holihan sons, James, Joseph and Charles, opened a brewery on land purchased near the corner of Andover and Beacon Streets in South Lawrence.  They called it the Diamond Spring Brewery, in reference to a spring already located on this site, formerly the Knowles farm.  In 1917, they branched into soft drinks using the spring water as a base.

Post-Prohibition
The brewery had a public "tap-room" that was available for public functions.

In its last years, Diamond Spring Brewery was a contract brewer for other brands.  The brewery was located at 50 Diamond Street.  It closed in 1970 and was converted in 1980 into housing.

List of beers
Diamond Spring Golden Ale  1933 - 1935
Diamond Spring Pale Ale  1933 - 1935
Beacon Ale  1933 - 1936
Diamond Spring Ale  1933 - 1936
Diamond Spring Beacon Ale  1933 - 1936
Diamond Spring Bock Beer  1933 - 1936
Diamond Spring Porter  1933 - 1936
Diamond Spring Prime Old Ale  1933 - 1936
Diamond Spring Tiger Ale  1933 - 1936
Holihan's Lager Beer  1933 - 1936
Holihan's Old Time Half Stock Ale  1933 - 1936
Holihan's Ale  1933 - 1950
Holihan's Beer  1933 - 1950
Holihan's Export Beer  1933 - 1950
Holihan's Half Stock Ale  1933 - 1950
Holihan's Light Ale  1933 - 1950
Holihan's Pilsener Beer  1933 - 1950
Holihan's Special Porter  1933 - 1950
Holihan's Stock Ale  1933 - 1950
Holihan's Porter  1934 - 1958
Beacon Ale  1937 - 1940
Holihan's Black Horse Ale  1959 - 1968

References

Brewery buildings in the United States
Distilleries in Massachusetts
Companies based in Lawrence, Massachusetts
Defunct brewery companies of the United States